Wreckage may refer to:
 Debris

Music
 Wreckage (album), a 2002 album by Overseer
 Wreckage (1969 band), a late 1960s band notable for featuring future Queen vocalist Freddie Mercury as a member
 Wreckage, a 1997 EP by the band Entombed
 "Wreckage", a song by Combichrist from Everybody Hates You
 "Wreckage", a song by the J. Geils Band from Monkey Island
 "Wreckage", a song by Parkway Drive from Deep Blue

Other uses
 Wreckage (G.I. Joe), a character in the G.I. Joe universe

See also
 Wreck (disambiguation)
 
 
 The Wreckage (disambiguation)